The 1985–86 Michigan State Spartans men's basketball team represented Michigan State University in the 1985–86 NCAA Division I men's basketball season. The team played their home games at Jenison Field House in East Lansing, Michigan and were members of the Big Ten Conference. They were coached by Jud Heathcote in his 10th year at Michigan State. The Spartans finished with a record of 23–8, 12–6 to finish in third place in Big Ten play. The Spartans received an at-large bid to the NCAA tournament for the second straight year. As the No. 5 seed in the Midwest region, they defeated Washington and Georgetown to advance to the Sweet Sixteen. There they lost to No. 1-seeded Kansas. The wins were the first NCAA tournament wins for the Spartans since 1979.

Previous season
The Spartans finished the 1984–85 season with a record of 19–10, 10–8 to finish in fifth place in Big Ten play. They received an at-large bid to the NCAA tournament as a No. 10 seed. There they lost to UAB in the First Round.

Roster and statistics 

Source

Schedule and results

|-
!colspan=9 style=| Non-conference regular season

|-
!colspan=9 style=| Big Ten regular season

|-
!colspan=9 style=|NCAA Tournament

Awards and honors
 Scott Skiles – All-Big Ten First Team

References

Michigan State Spartans men's basketball seasons
Michigan State
Michigan State
Michigan State Spartans men's b
Michigan State Spartans men's b